Bimal Soni was the manager of the Indian cricket team. He was also President of the Jaipur District Cricket Association, a constituent group of the Rajasthan Cricket Association.

References

Year of birth missing (living people)
Living people
Cricket managers
Place of birth missing (living people)